Gao'an railway station is a railway station on the Shanghai–Kunming high-speed railway located in Jiangxi, People's Republic of China. It is the first station to serve Gao'an.

History
The station opened on 16 September 2014.

References

Railway stations in Jiangxi
Railway stations in China opened in 2014